Pachycereus pringlei (also known as Mexican giant cardon or elephant cactus) is a species of large cactus native to northwestern Mexico, in the states of Baja California, Baja California Sur, and Sonora. It is commonly known as cardón, a name derived from the Spanish word cardo, meaning "thistle"; additionally, it is often referred to as sabueso (or “bloodhound”), which is possibly an early Spanish interpretation of the native Seri term for the plant, xaasj. 

Large stands of this cactus still exist, but many have been destroyed as land has been cleared for cultivation in Sonora.

The cactus fruits were always an important food for the Seri people, in Sonora; the dried cactus columns themselves could be used for construction purposes, as well as for firewood.

A symbiotic relationship with bacterial and fungal colonies, on its roots, allows P. pringlei to grow on bare rock, even where no soil is available at all; the cactus has the distinction of being lithophytic as needed. The root’s bacterial colonies can fix nitrogen from the air and break down the rock to expose hidden sources of nutrients. The cactus even evolved to maintain this symbiotic bacteria within its seeds, serving to benefit by taking it on as part of its very physical biology.

Morphology
In overall appearance, it resembles the related saguaro (Carnegiea gigantea), but differs in being more heavily branched and having branching nearer the base of the stem, fewer ribs on the stems, blossoms located lower along the stem, differences in areoles and spination, and spinier fruit.

Its flowers are white, large, nocturnal, and appear along the ribs as opposed to only apices of the stems.

Lifespan and growth
It is a slow-growing plant  with a lifespan measured in hundreds of years. One way scientists have aged these cacti has been to use radiocarbon dating to test the spines closest to the ground. Growth can be significantly enhanced in its initial stages by inoculation with plant growth-promoting bacteria such as Azospirillum species. Most adult cardon have several side branches that may be as massive as the trunk. The resulting tree may attain a weight of 25 tons.

Gallery

Notes
1.The tallest living cactus is a specimen of Pachycereus pringlei. The tallest cactus ever measured was an armless Saguaro cactus which blew over in a windstorm in 1986; it was 23.8 meters (78 feet) tall.

References

External links

Cacti Guide: Pachycereus pringlei
Video of a Cardón Planting

pringlei
Plants described in 1909
Cacti of Mexico
Flora of Baja California
Flora of Baja California Sur
Flora of Sonora
Desert fruits